Matthew Anthony Fitzsimons (1912 – October 24, 1992) was an American historian. He was a professor at the University of Notre Dame and was the longtime editor of The Review of Politics.

Biography 
Fitzsimons was a native of New York City. He earned an A.B. from Columbia University in 1934, and earned a two-year scholarship to the University of Oxford. He joined the faculty of the University of Notre Dame in 1937 and earned a doctorate from the University of Chicago in English history. He wrote extensively about English history, historiography, history of the Catholic Church and religious orders.

Fitzsimons was a close colleague and succeeded historian Waldemar Gurian as editor of the journal Review of Politics from 1955 to 1974. He died on October 24, 1992.

References 

1912 births
1992 deaths
University of Notre Dame faculty
Columbia College (New York) alumni
University of Chicago alumni
Alumni of the University of Oxford
American historians
Historians of England
20th-century American historians
People from New York City